Roseline Ngo Leyi (born 27 April 1993) is a Congolese handball player for Le Pouzin Handball and the DR Congo national team.

She represented DR Congo at the 2019 World Women's Handball Championship.

References

External links

1993 births
Living people
Democratic Republic of the Congo female handball players
Handball players from Paris
French female handball players